Harm van Veldhoven (born 28 September 1962 in Luyksgestel) is a Dutch-Belgian football manager who is currently unemployed after last managing Westerlo.

Van Veldhoven started his career with local youth team De Raven. He was picked up by SK Lommel at the age of 17. He made his way up to the highest level of Belgian football with Germinal Ekeren. He then went to RWDM and eventually returned to SK Lommel when they had also arrived in First Division. The 3 teams for which van Veldhoven was active as footballer at senior level, are already all defunct.

He began his career as striker. But throughout his career, he went more and more playing as midfielder or even defender.

When Harm van Veldhoven finished his playing career with Lommel, he became assistant coach. It only took him one season to become head manager of the team. Afterwards, he was manager for FC Brussels with which he became champions. This success woke the interest of Cercle Brugge, where he stayed 3 years. When his contract ended, van Veldhoven went to Germinal Beerschot, of which his former team Germinal Ekeren was a predecessor. After a very successful season, he could not repeat his achievement and was sacked as a consequence. He went back to his country of birth and signed for Roda JC in November 2008. He avoided relegation after playoffs. His contract ended in 2012, which allowed him to sign with KV Mechelen, where he was sacked on 30 December 2013.

External links
Harm van Veldhoven at Rodajc.nl  
Cercle Brugge manager history 
Harm van Veldhoven at Ronaldzwiers.com  

1962 births
Living people
Dutch footballers
Van Veldhoven, Harm
K.F.C. Lommel S.K. players
Beerschot A.C. players
R.W.D. Molenbeek players
Van Veldhoven, Harm
Van Veldhoven, Harm
Challenger Pro League players
Indian Super League head coaches
Belgian expatriate football managers
Van Veldhoven, Harm
Van Veldhoven, Harm
Roda JC Kerkrade managers
People from Bergeijk
Beerschot A.C. managers
K.V. Mechelen managers
K.V.C. Westerlo managers
Association football defenders
Association football midfielders
Association football forwards
Footballers from North Brabant
Belgian expatriate sportspeople in India